Joseph Son Sam-seok (born November 3, 1955) is a bishop of the Roman Catholic Diocese of Busan.

Biography
Joseph Son Sam-seok was ordained a priest on February 6, 1982. On June 4, 2010, Pope Benedict XVI appointed him Auxiliary Bishop of Busan and Titular Bishop of Fesseë. He was consecrated bishop on July 9, 2010, by Paul Hwang Chul-soo, Bishop of Busan with Thaddeus Cho Hwan-Kil, Auxiliary bishop of Daegu and John Chrisostom Kwon Hyok-ju, Bishop of Andong as Co-Consecrators. Bishop Son Sam-seok had been serving as apostolic administration of diocese of Busan since the resignation of Bishop Paul Hwang Chul-soo in August 2018. He was named Bishop of Busan in April 2019.

References

South Korean Roman Catholic bishops
1955 births
Living people
People from Busan
Bishops appointed by Pope Benedict XVI
Roman Catholic bishops of Busan